André Luís dos Santos known as André Santos (born 22 January 1975) is a former Brazilian footballer.

Biography
André Santos was signed by Turkish club Gaziantepspor from Associação Atlética Ponte Preta in January 2002. He played 17 games in 2001–02 Süper Lig. In July 2002 his contract was terminated.

In April 2005 he was signed by Ceará Sporting Club in 6-month contract. In December 2005 he was signed by Associação Atlética Aparecidense until the end of 2006 Campeonato Goiano. In July, he left for Goiânia Esporte Clube. His contract was extended in November 2006, to the end of 2007 Campeonato Goiano. He then joined Morrinhos Futebol Clube and transferred to Trindade Atlético Clube in January 2008. In June 2008 he was re-signed by Goiânia but released in August.

References

External links
 
 TFF Profile
 Article on a fans blog 

Brazilian footballers
Associação Atlética Ponte Preta players
Gaziantepspor footballers
Ceará Sporting Club players
Goiânia Esporte Clube players
Süper Lig players
Association football defenders
Brazilian expatriate footballers
Brazilian expatriate sportspeople in Turkey
Expatriate footballers in Turkey
Footballers from São Paulo
1976 births
Living people